C Sports Racer (CSR) now known as Prototype 1 (P1) is a class in the Sports Car Club of America. it consists of open top prototype style cars. The maximum displacement is 1615cc, in a 2 valve crossflow engine, with a minimum weight of 1300lbs w/driver. Two cycle or 4 valve/4 cycle motors between 850cc and 1300cc are permitted with a minimum weight of 1200lbs. Supercharging and turbocharging are permitted within limits, and with a maximum displacement of 765cc. Some CSRs are Formula Atlantic or Formula SCCA cars converted by adding bodywork to the chassis.

C Sports Racer at the SCCA National Championship Runoffs

References 

Sports prototypes
Sports Car Club of America
Sports car racing series